Black Bottom was a predominantly black neighborhood in Detroit, Michigan, United States. The term has sometimes been used to apply to the entire neighborhood including Paradise Valley, but many consider the two neighborhoods to be separate. Together, Black Bottom and Paradise Valley were bounded by Brush Street to the west, the Grand Trunk railroad tracks to the east, south to the Detroit River, and bisected by Gratiot Avenue. The area north of Grand Boulevard was defined as Paradise Valley.

Although the name "Black Bottom" is often erroneously believed to be a reference to the African-American community that developed in the twentieth century, the neighborhood was actually named by early French colonial settlers for the dark, fertile topsoil found in the area (known as river bottomlands). During World War I, Black Bottom was home to many Eastern European Jewish immigrants, and the Great Migration influx of southern African Americans combined with redlining created a majority black neighborhood within Detroit. As the Black Bottom grew, it soon became known as a lively area with  jazz bars and nightclubs. From the 1930s to the 1950s, residents in Black Bottom made significant contributions to American music, including blues, Big Band, and jazz.

Despite the rich cultural and musical hub of Black Bottom, the neighborhood was plagued with urban poverty.  Most of Black Bottom's residents were employed in manufacturing and the automotive factory jobs.  Some black business owners and clergymen operating in the neighborhood were able to rise to the middle class,however many moved to the newer and better-constructed Detroit West Side neighborhoods. Historical lack of access for the general population of African Americans to New Deal and Veterans Administration housing benefits combined with redlining segregated the neighborhoods from surrounding areas. 

In the early 1960s, the Black Bottom and Paradise Valley neighborhoods were demolished for the purpose of slum clearance and to make way for the construction of I-375. Homes and businesses were demolished and residents relocated to outside neighborhoods.

History

Historically, this geographical area was the source of the River Savoyard, which was buried as a sewer in 1827. The river's flooding produced rich bottomland soils, for which early French colonial settlers named the area "Black Bottom". Before World War I, European immigrants populated the area and built the frame houses that would later be razed for urban renewal. 

In the early twentieth century, European immigrants and blacks lived together in an ad-hoc integrated neighborhood. Coleman Young, the first black mayor of Detroit, moved to Black Bottom with his family in 1923; he states his neighbors as Italian, Syrian, German, and Jewish. Young is quoted as having "loved that neighborhood." Surrounding neighborhoods passed restrictive covenants prohibting blacks from purchasing or renting property in the adjacent areas, functionally confining residents to Black Bottom. During the Great Migration, the area was primarily settled by blacks who established a community of businesses, social institutions, and night clubs. Detroit's Broadway Avenue Historic District contains a sub-district sometimes called the Harmonie Park District. It is associated with the legacy of Detroit's music from the 1930s-1950s.

The area's main commercial avenues were Hastings and St. Antoine streets.  Paradise Valley contained night clubs where famous artists such as Billie Holiday, Sam Cooke, Ella Fitzgerald, Duke Ellington, Billy Eckstine, Pearl Bailey, and Count Basie regularly performed. In 1941, the city's Orchestra Hall was named Paradise Theatre. Reverend C. L. Franklin, father of singer Aretha Franklin, originally established his New Bethel Baptist Church on Hastings Street. Paradise Valley housed the Gotham Hotel, which was known as a safe and upscale hotel for African Americans. Gotham Hotel was demolished in 1963. Black Bottom's business district contained doctor's offices, hospitals, drug stores, and other services. 

Black Bottom was one of the poorest and densest sections of Detroit, with a third of black Detroiters living within Paradise Valley. Homes commonly held three to four families within the dwelling.  Overcrowding, disease, crime, and vermin ran rampant within the boundaries of Black Bottom and Paradise Valley.  Income inequality and redlining contributed to deferred housing upkeep and maintenance, which further deteriorated housing conditions.

Following World War II, two-thirds of the physical structures of Black Bottom had been classified as aging and substandard, lacking modern amenities, or sitting in significant disrepair. The city government considered these areas slums and designated those remaining after the highway construction for clearance through a series of revitalization projects. Areas of both Black Bottom and Paradise Valley faced destruction for the construction of medical and city-run institutions, as well as public housing projects." The passage of the Federal Housing Act of 1949 funded demolition. The City of Detroit sent photographers out to document structures, the area dismissed as a "slum." The approximately 2,000 images document clapboard houses, churches, and corner stores; many of which appear in better repair than the formal descriptions. The photographs are now housed in the Burton Historical Collection at the Detroit Public Library. By 1950, 423 residences, 109 businesses, 22 manufacturing plants, and 93 vacant lots had been condemned for one freeway project.

The Federal Highway Act of 1956 funded the highway construction over Hastings Street and surrounding city blocks. The highways, such as the Chrysler (formerly Oakland-Hastings) Freeway, bisected the rest of the Lower East Side, including Paradise Valley and Black Bottom. The Edsel Ford Freeway also cut through the northernmost part of Paradise Valley. 

The sites of Black Bottom and Paradise Valley were replaced with private housing from the Gratiot Redevelopment Project. The City of Detroit also supported construction of Lafayette Park, a modernist residential development designed by Mies van der Rohe, intended as a model neighborhood containing residential townhouses, apartments and high-rises with commercial areas.  Many of the former residents of Black Bottom were relocated to public housing projects, such as the Brewster-Douglass Housing Projects (a public housing project built near Black Bottom starting in the 1930s) and Jeffries Homes. Jeffries Home was demolished in 2001 and Brewster-Douglass demolished in 2008. 

In 2000, the final three structures of Paradise Valley were razed. A Michigan Historical Site marker sign on the former intersection of Adams Avenue and St. Antoine St., currently near Ford Field, exists as the last physical marker of the neighborhood. 

Architect Emily Kutil plans to recreate the neighborhood virtually, using photos from the Detroit Public Library's Burton Historical Collection, through a website called Black Bottom Street View. The website will purportedly also feature oral histories from past residents. 

The University of Michigan and Olympia Development have announced a new project at 1400 S. Antoine St. (at the intersection of Gratiot Ave. and I-375) for a 190,000 square feet structure including  "residential units, a hotel, a conference center and a business collaboration and incubation space." Project funders include Stephen M. Ross and Dan Gilbert.   Professor Stephen Ward of the University of Michgan's Department of Afro-American studies has challenged the project; he signed a Change.org petition entitled "#UMichRegentrifiers: Invest in Detroiters" which has been created by a University of Michigan student opposing the project.  In September 2022, the Biden-Harris Administration awarded Detroit a $104-million Department of Transportation grant for the I-375 project in Detroit which would demolish the current 1.062 mile-long sunken highway to construct a proposed lower speed boulevard at street-level by 2024. This project will reconnect neighborhood streets cut off by the sunken highway for decades.

Geography
Historically, the primary business district was in an area bounded by Vernor, John R., Madison, and Hastings, with Gratiot Avenue running through the district as a spoke on the "hub-and-spoke" road layout of Detroit.  The business district included hotels, restaurants, music stores, bowling alleys, shops, policy offices, and grocery stores. There were 17 nightclubs in the business district. The sunken I-375 highway passes directly over where Hastings Ave. once was.

Notable people
 Fard Muhammad
 Elijah Muhammad
 Della Reese
 Joe Louis
 Sugar Ray Robinson
 Robert Hayden
 Stephen M. Ross
 Mary Wells
Coleman Young

See also

 History of African Americans in Detroit

References

Bibliography
 
 
Sugrue, Thomas J (2005). The Origins of the Urban Crisis: Race and Inequality in Postwar Detroit. United States: Princeton University Press

External links
 Lafayette Park/Mies van der Rohe Historic District
 Paradise Valley Marker
 Walter P. Reuther Library Article on the history of Black Bottom
 When Detroit paved over paradise: The story of I-375
 1930s and 1940s photographs of children in Black Bottom and Paradise Valley at the Walter P. Reuther Library
 The Destruction of Detroit's Black Bottom, by Howard Husock in Reason Magazine (Mar 2022)
 Black Bottom Street View

African-American history in Detroit
Ethnic enclaves in Michigan
Music of Detroit
History of racism in Michigan